The Diocese of Buffalo is a Latin Church diocese of the Catholic Church headquartered in Buffalo, New York, United States. It is a suffragan diocese within the metropolitan province of the Archdiocese of New York.  The Diocese of Buffalo includes eight counties in Western New York State. The Buffalo Diocese was established in 1847. From the Diocese of Buffalo, the Diocese of Rochester was created in 1868.

Bishop Michael William Fisher is the current bishop of the diocese.

Range and population

The Diocese covers  throughout the eight counties of Western New York. As of 2018, the diocese has a Catholic population of 725,125.  In the Diocese are 161 parishes, 15 high schools, 52 elementary schools, seven colleges and universities, one seminary, convents, and four hospitals.

History

Early years
The Roman Catholic Diocese of Buffalo was established April 23, 1847. It was set apart from the great Diocese of New York; the See is located at Buffalo on Lake Erie.

The first Mass held in the area of what would later become the Diocese of Buffalo was likely that celebrated on December 11, 1678 by Father Louis Hennepin, who had accompanied La Salle on an expedition to explore the western part of New France.

By 1820 many Alsatians moved to the area. Many were Catholics, but as they had no priest, they could only keep alive the religious spirit by family devotions. The Rev. Patrick Kelly, ordained by Bishop Connolly of New York in 1821, was sent to minister to the Catholics of the western part of the State. He visited Buffalo the same year, and held one public service in a little frame building on Pearl Street. The Rev. Stephen Badin was the first priest to remain any length of time in Buffalo. He visited Buffalo for six weeks as the guest of Louis Le Couteulx, who then lived at the corner of Main and Exchange Streets. Here he said Mass for the Catholics of the town and urged them to organize and form a congregation Mr. Le Couteulx donated a site for church, cemetery, and priest's residence, at the corner of Main and Edward Streets. (Besides donating the site for the first church, he also gave the land for the Deaf Mute Institute, the Infant Asylum, Immaculate Conception Church, and the Buffalo Orphan asylum.)

Nearly all the priests who laboured in Western New York during this period were from Europe, and some were not permanently attached to the diocese. The small number of priests could not visit regularly the many small settlements in that extensive territory, and many Catholics would not see a priest for months, or even years. Before there was a resident priest at Buffalo people journeyed all the way to Albany to have their children baptized, others took their children to Monroe, Michigan, where there was a resident priest. A journey to Albany at that time meant many days travel through the forest, on horseback, by stage-coach, or rough wagons. When the Erie Canal was built, part of the journey could be made by packet boat; but as a rule people postponed the reception of the sacraments until some priest went through this region on his way to the settlements of the West, or in transit between the East and Montreal or Quebec.

Bishop Dubois visited Buffalo in 1829 and concluded that the number of Catholics in the vicinity required the attention of a resident priest, so the Rev. John Nicholas Mertz was sent as the first pastor of Buffalo. Father Mertz rented a little frame building on Pearl Street, back of the old Eagle tavern; and here he held services until the "Lamb of God", a rough timber church, was erected on the property at Main and Edward Streets in 1832. He was assisted by the Rev. Alexander Pax. In the next five years congregations were formed at Lancaster, Williamsville, North Bush, East Eden, and Lockport.

Mertz went to Europe to raise funds, and Dubois sent the newly ordained John Neumann, later Bishop of Philadelphia, to assist Father Pax. After a brief stay in Rochester, Neumann arrived in Buffalo in July, 1836. Based out of Williamsville, Neumann laboured zealously for four years in the missions of the Erie County and vicinity. The missionary then had few of the comforts and conveniences of the present day and Father Neumann was often compelled to tramp many miles over rough roads, or through the forest, carrying his vestments on his back, to say Mass or to administer to the sick. In 1837, he moved his headquarters to North Bush.

Rev. Bernard O'Reilly of Rochester, (later Bishop of Hartford), also did effective work among those engaged in building the Erie Canal and in constructing the locks at Lockport. The Rev. Thomas McEvoy of Java attended to the spiritual needs of the Catholics in Allegany, Wyoming, Steuben, and Chautauqua counties.

As the city grew, the church on Main Street became too small for the rapidly increasing numbers. The English-speaking members withdrew from the church in 1837 and formed a separate congregation, renting the second floor of a building at the corner of Main Street and the Terrace; where the Rev. Charles Smith said Mass for them once a month. Soon afterwards property was bought at the corner of Ellicott and Batavia Streets.

Establishment
The Very Rev. John Timon, Visitor General of the Congregation of the Mission (Vincentians) was consecrated first Bishop of Buffalo in St. Patrick's Old Cathedral in New York, 17 October 1847, by Bishop Hughes. Timon was fluent in several languages including Gaelic, which served him well among the Irish community in the city. He appointed Bernard O'Reilly, pastor of St. Patrick's church, Rochester, his vicar-general, and gave missions for his people in the sixteen churches of the diocese. In many cases services were held in rented buildings, especially where public works attracted large numbers of men but gave no promise of permanent settlement. Such was the case along the Erie Canal and the Genesee Valley Canal, where services were held in the largest workmen's shanty, or in the nearest town hall. Men engaged in these public works were attracted by the fertility of the soil or the advantages of localities, and sent for their families and friends, and established homes in the western part of the State along the lines of public traffic. Thus small settlements were formed, and incipient congregations were organized.

The cornerstone of St. Joseph Cathedral was laid on February 6, 1851.  During construction, a storm approached the city from Lake Erie and destroyed several homes in the area.  Bishop Timon had the residents to set up tents sheltered within the cathedral's walls for several weeks. The cathedral was usable, but not complete, when it was dedicated on July 1, 1855.

One of Bishop Timon's first labours was directed to the establishment of colleges and seminaries for the education of youth. In 1851 Rev. Lucas Caveng, a German Jesuit, along with 19 families from St. Louis Church, founded St. Michael's Church on Washington Street. Canisius College was founded primarily to educate the sons of German immigrants. Timon persuaded his own congregation to establish an educational institute. In 1856  The Vincentians founded Our Lady of the Angels Seminary, which later became Niagara University.

He induced the Oblates, the Franciscans, and the Jesuits to send communities to found colleges, and to assist in the formation of parishes. The Oblate Fathers in August, 1851, started a seminary and college in a brick building, which was located on the site of the present cathedral rectory. This institution was later transferred to Prospect Hill, on the site of the present Holy Angels church property. The Franciscans in 1855 located at Ellicottville, but shortly after moved to Allegany. In 1861 the Sisters of St. Francis of Philadelphia established a Home for the Aged. Two years later the sisters in Buffalo formed a separate congregation, the Sisters of St. Francis Third Order Regular of Buffalo.

In 1868, the Diocese of Rochester was formed from the eastern counties of the territory of the Diocese of Buffalo.  In 1896, after Bishop Stephen Vincent Ryan's death, four more counties, including Steuben, Schuyler, Chemung, and Tioga, were taken from the Diocese of Buffalo and added to the Rochester jurisdiction.

Reports of sex abuse
On September 12, 2018, church records showed that there were 106 clergy in the Diocese of Buffalo who had been credibly accused of sexually abusing children, far more than a list of 42 which had been released by the Diocese in March of the year. A spokesperson for the diocese said that the list reflected " priests against whom we had substantiated allegations – meaning more than one allegation – and were accused of abusing minors, not adults."

A number of former bishops including Bishop Richard J. Malone, have been accused of shielding some of the accused priests," from potential prosecution by transferring some to other parishes to avoid scrutiny. Malone was also revealed in August 2018 to have returned at least one accused priest to active ministry. A few clergy on the list who were still active in ministry have been suspended. On September 28, Malone named Steven L. Halter, a former agent in the FBI's Buffalo Division who took part in the investigations of the 9/11 World Trade Center and USS Cole attacks committed by the Islamic terrorist organization Al Qaeda and who served as senior accounting officer at Empire of America Federal Savings Bank, Buffalo beforehand, director of the Diocese's newly created Office of Personal Responsibility, which handles sex abuse complaints in the Diocese.

On 28 May 2019, it was announced that the Diocese of Buffalo's compensation program had by that point paid $17.5 million to 106 childhood victims of clergy sexual abuse, while rejecting 135 applicants it deemed ineligible for its voluntary compensation program. In June 2019, however, it was announced that plaintiff James Bottlinger had declined a $650,000 offer to settle his sex-abuse lawsuit against the Diocese of Buffalo and will continue to pursue his lawsuit in court. Bottlinger has also implicated former Erie, Pennsylvania Bishop Donald Trautman of protecting his abuser  Rev. Michael Freeman from potential prosecution when Trautman served as the second-highest ranking official in the Diocese of Buffalo in the 1980s. Bottlinger is using the state of New York's new Child Victims Act to sue the Diocese of Buffalo. Aside from Bottlinger, who stated that Freeman started abusing him in 1984, two other men accused Freeman of molesting them when they were boys as well. Complaints against Freeman also surfaced by 1981. However, Freeman died in 2010.

In September 2019, it was reported that under the Child Victims Act, 100 different sex abuse lawsuits were filed against the Diocese of Buffalo. 83 of these lawsuits were filed when the law went into effect on August 14, 2019. A criminal investigation was initiated regarding diocesan priest Rev. Jeffrey Novak, A spokesperson for the District Attorney’s office, said the allegations were “thoroughly investigated” and a decision was made to not bring forward any charges and the criminal investigation file has been closed.<ref>[https://www.wgrz.com/article/news/special-reports/diocese-in-crisis/no-charges-seminarian-claims/71-dfdfdf15-b489-4a42-8acf-1fef2bc92f4c Brown, Steve. Investigation of former seminarian's allegations results in no criminal charges", 2WGRZ, January 15, 2020]</ref>

In September 2019 the Diocese published an Adult Sexual Misconduct Policy and Procedures and a new Code of Pastoral Conduct for Clergy. On 2 October 2019, local news reported that the number of accused clergy in the Roman Catholic Diocese of Buffalo had grown to 168 and that the Diocese had now paid a six figure settlement to a victim of one of the newly named clergy, the now deceased Fr. Maurus Schenck, for sex abuse committed at St. Mary's Parish in Dunkirk when the unnamed victim was a 13-year old boy in 1965.

On 20 October 2019, revelations surfaced that the Diocese of Buffalo removed Rev. Norbert F. Orsolits from his parish in South Buffalo in 1968 after he was accused of sexually abusing children. One of the alleged victims filed a lawsuit against the Diocese for abuse he alleged was committed by Orsolits. The alleged victim also accused Orsolits' replacement William F. J. White of sexually abusing him as well. On 31 October 2019, Brooklyn Bishop Nicholas DiMarzio, who the Congregation of Bishops assigned on 3 October 2019 to investigate the Diocese, completed his investigation of the Diocese of Buffalo's sex abuse scandal."Buffalo diocese investigation ends, DiMarzio will send report to Vatican", Catholic News Agency, October 31, 2019. DiMarzio based the details of his investigation from interviews he had with 80 local clergy and lay people."

Pope Francis accepted Malone's resignation on December 4, 2019. He named Albany's Bishop Edward B. Scharfenberger the apostolic administrator of the Diocese, with authority to manage its affairs pending the appointment of a successor to Malone. 60 Minutes Overtime reported that Malone's resignation was linked to leaked sex abuse documents which were reported by 60 Minutes'' journalist Bill Whitaker in 2018. On December 10, Malone gave his first interview since his resignation, where he stated to WIVB that while he did not want to submit his resignation until he reached the mandatory retirement age of 75, he also agreed to submit an early resignation to Pope Francis so the Diocese of Buffalo could "move forward."

On May 4, 2020, Diocese of Buffalo filed an adversary motion to freeze the lawsuits, stating that it was no longer financially stable enough to pay future sex abuse settlements if the lawsuits continued. The same day, the Diocese of Buffalo also appointed Sister Mary McCarrick, who had previously served as director of the Diocese's charities and received praise in 2018 for her handling of families dealing with sex abuse, as the Diocese's first Chief Operating Officer (COO).

On May 8, 2020, New York Governor Andrew Cuomo extended the statute of limitations deadline to file sex abuse lawsuits in the state of New York, which was originally set for August 14, 2020, to January 14, 2021.

Bankruptcy and termination of payment and financial aid for accused clergy

On February 28, 2020, the Diocese officially filed for bankruptcy as a result of the numerous sexual abuse lawsuits. This comes weeks after the Diocese announced that they will be ceasing operations at Christ the King Seminary in East Aurora, NY. On April 28, 2020, Scharfenberger and Diocese spokesman Greg Tucker revealed that as part of the bankruptcy agreement, the Diocese of Buffalo would cease to provide regular payment and other financial support - which includes retirement payments, health care, dental care and car insurance - to 23 Diocese priests effective May 1, 2020. All 23 priests are currently suspended due to substantial sex abuse allegations which were brought against them as well. On May 6, 2020, months after his resignation, it was revealed that Malone secretly removed accused priest Fr. Paul Salemi from the Diocese of Buffalo in 2012, but then allowed the Diocese to keep Salemi "on the diocesan payroll" after Salemi moved to the South as well. However, payment to Salemi ended on May 1, 2020, as he was among the 23 accused clergy who were suspended by the Diocese of Buffalo.

State investigation and lawsuit
On November 23, 2020, New York Attorney General Letitia James filed a civil lawsuit against the Diocese of Buffalo, retired Bishop Richard J. Malone, and retired Auxiliary Bishop Edward M. Grosz charging misuse of funds to cover up alleged sex abuse on the part of more than two dozen priests. At the same time, her office released a 218-page report detailing the results of a two-year investigation into all the parties named in the lawsuit.

Territories
The Diocese of Buffalo includes the following eight counties in Western New York State:  

Allegany
Cattaraugus
Chautauqua
Erie
Genesee
Niagara 
Orleans
Wyoming

Bishops
The lists of bishops and auxiliary bishops of the diocese and their years of service, followed by other priests of this diocese who became bishops:

Bishops of Buffalo
 John Timon, C.M. (1847–1867)
 Stephen V. Ryan, C.M. (1868–1896)
 James Edward Quigley (1896–1903), appointed Archbishop of Chicago
 Charles H. Colton (1903–1915)
 Dennis Joseph Dougherty (1915–1918), appointed Archbishop of Philadelphia (elevated to Cardinal in 1921)
 William Turner (1919–1936)
 John Aloysius Duffy (1937–1944)
 John Francis O'Hara, C.S.C. (1945–1951), appointed Archbishop of Philadelphia (elevated to Cardinal in 1958)
 Joseph Aloysius Burke (1952–1962)
 James Aloysius McNulty (1963–1972)
 Edward Dennis Head (1973–1995)
 Henry Joseph Mansell (1995–2003), appointed Archbishop of Hartford
 Edward Urban Kmiec (2004–2012)
 Richard Joseph Malone (2012–2019)
 Michael William Fisher (2021–present)

Former auxiliary bishops
Joseph Aloysius Burke (1943–1952), appointed Bishop of Buffalo
Leo Richard Smith (1952–1963), appointed Bishop of Ogdensburg  
Pius Anthony Benincasa (1964–1986)
Stanislaus Joseph Brzana (1964–1968), appointed Bishop of Ogdensburg  
Bernard Joseph McLaughlin (1969–1988)
Donald Walter Trautman (1985–1990), appointed Bishop of Erie  
Edward M. Grosz (1990–2020)

Other priests of this diocese who became bishops
Francis Xavier Krautbauer, appointed Bishop of Green Bay in 1875
Thomas J. Walsh, appointed Bishop of Trenton in 1918 and later Bishop and Archbishop of Newark
Edmund F. Gibbons, appointed Bishop of Albany in 1919
John Joseph McMahon, appointed Bishop of Trenton in 1928
James Johnston Navagh, appointed Auxiliary Bishop of Raleigh in 1952 and later Bishop of Ogdensburg and Bishop of Paterson
Celestine Joseph Damiano, appointed Apostolic Delegate to South Africa and Titular Archbishop in 1952 and later Archbishop (personal title) of Camden
John Joseph Fitzpatrick (priest here, 1942–1948), appointed Auxiliary Bishop of Miami in 1968 and later Bishop of Brownsville
 Robert Joseph Cunningham, appointed Bishop of Ogdensburg in 2004 and later Bishop of Syracuse

Major ministries

 Campus Ministries
 Catholic Charities
 Catholic Health System
 Holy Name Society
 St. Vincent de Paul Society
 Office of Pro-Life Ministries

Hospitals and affiliates

 Bertrand Chaffee Hospital, Springville
 Catholic Medical Partners, Buffalo
 Kenmore Mercy Hospital, Kenmore 
 Mercy Hospital of Buffalo, Buffalo
 Mount St. Mary's Hospital and Health Center, Lewiston
 Sisters of Charity Hospital, Buffalo
 Sisters of Charity Hospital, St. Joseph Campus, Cheektowaga

Seminaries

Christ the King Seminary
The seminary was founded in 1857 as part of the St. Bonaventure College in Allegany, New York. In 1950, St. Bonaventure became a University, which included a School on Theology. In 1974, it moved to a 132-acre campus at East Aurora. It ceased operations at the end of the 2020-21 academic year.

Convents
 Convent of the Franciscan Sisters of St. Joseph, Hamburg, New York
 Villa Maria Motherhouse Complex, also known as the Felician Sisters Immaculate Heart of Mary Convent Chapel and Convent, Cheektowaga, New York
 Sisters of St. Francis of Penance and Christian Charity at Stella Niagara Education Park, Stella Niagara, Lewiston, New York

Colleges and universities

 Canisius College, Buffalo
 D'Youville College, Buffalo
 Hilbert College, Hamburg
 Niagara University, Lewiston
 St. Bonaventure University, St. Bonaventure
 Trocaire College, Buffalo
 Villa Maria College of Buffalo, Buffalo

High schools

 Archbishop Walsh High School, Olean
 Bishop Timon – St. Jude High School, Buffalo
 Buffalo Academy of the Sacred Heart, Buffalo
 Canisius High School, Buffalo
 Cardinal O'Hara High School, Town of Tonawanda
 Chesterton Academy of Buffalo, Lancaster
 Mount Mercy Academy, Buffalo
 Mount Saint Mary Academy, Kenmore
 Nardin Academy, Buffalo
 Niagara Catholic High School, Niagara Falls (Closed)
 Notre Dame High School, Batavia
 Saint Francis High School, Athol Springs
 St. Joseph's Collegiate Institute, Buffalo
 St. Mary's High School, Lancaster

Elementary schools

 Catholic Academy of Niagara Falls, Niagara Falls
 Catholic Academy of West Buffalo, Buffalo
 Christ the King School, Snyder
 DeSales Catholic School, Lockport
 Immaculate Conception School, East Aurora
 Immaculate Conception School of Allegany County, Wellsville
 Mary Queen of Angels Regional School, Cheektowaga
 Nardin Academy Elementary and Montessori Divisions, Buffalo
 NativityMiguel Middle School of Buffalo, Buffalo
 Nativity of our Lord School, Orchard Park
 Nativity of the Blessed Virgin Mary School, Clarence
 Niagara Catholic Junior High School, Niagara Falls
 Northern Chautauqua Catholic School, Dunkirk
 Our Lady of Black Rock School, Buffalo
 Our Lady of the Blessed Sacrament School, Depew
 Our Lady of Victory School, Lackawanna
 Queen of Heaven School, West Seneca
 Sacred Heart Villa School, Lewiston
 South Buffalo Catholic School - Notre Dame Academy, Buffalo
 Southern Tier Catholic School, Olean
 Southtowns Catholic School, Lake View
 SS. Peter and Paul School, Hamburg
 SS. Peter and Paul School, Williamsville
 St. Aloysius Regional School, Springville
 St. Amelia School, Tonawanda
 St. Andrew's Country Day School, Kenmore
 St. Benedict School, Amherst
 St. Christopher School, Tonawanda
 St. Gregory the Great School, Williamsville
 St. John the Baptist School, Alden
 St. John the Baptist School, Kenmore
 St. John Vianney School, Orchard Park
 St. Joseph School, Batavia
 St. Joseph University School, Buffalo
 St. Mark School, Buffalo
 St. Mary's Elementary School, Lancaster
 St. Mary's School, Swormville
 St. Peter School, Lewiston
 St. Stephen School, Grand Island
 Stella Niagara Education Park, Stella Niagara

School restructuring
In 2005, Bishop Edward Kmiec announced that the Diocese would begin a school restructuring effort as part of the "Journey of Faith and Grace Campaign."  In 2007, 14 Catholic elementary schools in the Diocese closed.  The closures, alphabetically by city, included Most Precious Blood, Angola; Genesee-Wyoming Catholic, Attica; St. Agnes, St. Bernard, and St. Rose of Lima, Buffalo; Infant of Prague, St. Josaphat, Kolbe Catholic, Resurrection, and St. Aloysius Gonzaga, Cheektowaga; St. Barnabas, Depew; St. Hyacinth, Dunkirk; Blessed Sacrament, Kenmore; and St. Edmund, Tonawanda.  The school closures caused job losses to 158 full-time and 49 part-time employees.  More than 1,410 students were negatively affected by the school closures in 2007, and were required to enroll in other educational programs outside of these schools.  In the five years immediately preceding the school closures, many families had already begun removing their children from Catholic schools in the diocese due to the instability of the schools, and concerns about not desiring their children to be enrolled in schools in which there was little or no future.

While the average cost of teaching one student in the 14 schools in 2007 was $4,738, the average tuition cost for the student was $1,525.  Therefore, the debt of those schools' parishes averaged $224,160, and totaled more than $3.3 million altogether.  Secretary of the Department of Catholic Education Denise McKenzie stated that the deficit can, therefore, lead to a significant deficit in the schools and associated parishes even prior to the beginning of each school year.  The Diocese of Buffalo contributed millions of dollars to support schools whose parishes used up monies to subsidize their schools.  In early 2007 alone, the Diocese was operating with a $2.1 million deficit, in part, due to the subsidies provided to schools and parishes.

Cheektowaga, the area hardest-hit by the school closures with five schools lost in 2007, experienced great demographic changes in recent years.  The area was once heavily Catholic, though the majority of the population of older adults has been replaced by those who are younger and non-Catholic.  Younger couples have moved to the area, purchasing starter homes, and have moved out of the area when they begin having children, causing a decline in enrollments in the city's Catholic schools, particularly in kindergarten classes.  The dramatic change has resulted in drastically reduced enrollments, for example in the Infant of Prague School that had 1,120 students in 1960, and had only 117 enrolled students in 2007.  St. Barnabas School in Depew – one of the schools that closed in 2007 – had only 57 students enrolled that year, making it less than minimally viable per Msgr. John Madsen.

References

External links

 Roman Catholic Diocese of Buffalo Official Site

 
Culture of Buffalo, New York
Buffalo
Buffalo
Buffalo
1847 establishments in New York (state)
Companies that filed for Chapter 11 bankruptcy in 2020